The 3-inch Gun, Model of 1902 was the U.S. Army’s first nickel steel, quick-firing field gun with a recoil mechanism. Like its predecessor the 3.2-inch gun M1897, it was a rifled breechloader.

Design
During the second half of 1890s the so-called "quick-firing revolution" was underway, and many countries from Russia and Germany to the Transvaal Republic started to adopt guns with some recoil systems, but the Army adopted a morally obsolete 3.2-inch gun M1897 instead. Quickly realizing the mistake, the Ordnance Department alongside the M1897 production started development of what was termed an "accelerated-fire gun", and Captain Charles B. Wheeler designed a 3-inch gun which allowed more shots to be made faster but still required to relay the gun after each shoot. However by 1900, when its procurement was underway, first concrete information about the revolutionary French Canon de 75 modèle 1897 was declassified and new true quick-firing designs with a long recoil by private manufacturers emerged in Europe, and the Commanding General of the United States Army Nelson A. Miles lobbied Secretary of War Elihu Root to block the process. In 1901 long-recoil guns were tested and deemed superior, so in 1902 the Ordnance Department combined Wheeler's piece and an Ehrhardt piece (probably similar to the Norwegian M1901) in one design.

The features of rifling, breech loading with fixed ammunition, and a hydraulic-spring system to absorb the gun's recoil and quickly return it to the firing position combined to improve the range, accuracy, and rate of fire of the gun compared with previous weapons, allowing it to be used more effectively in operations with infantry. These new capabilities allowed the gun to provide accurate indirect fire on targets not in a direct line of sight, which provided crucial firepower for infantry attacks. It was also one of the first US artillery guns with an armored shield to protect the crew from small arms fire. The use of nickel steel construction meant that the M1902 could fire a heavier shell at a higher muzzle velocity and greater accuracy (due to tighter rifling) than any other field gun of American origin to that point. The maximum rate of fire was 15 rounds per minute.

Service history
This weapon replaced the 3.2-inch gun M1897 in most combat units, but both weapons remained in service until after World War I. General John J. Pershing brought several of the guns with him during the "Punitive Expedition" against Mexican forces in 1916–17, but they were not fired in combat.

The M1902 was in service from 1902 through 1919. During World War I, the Army primarily used the French 75 mm 1897 gun instead of the M1902s, which were mostly kept in the United States for training. Although this weapon appears in World War I-era tables of organization and equipment, very few of the M1902s were used in combat in Europe. They were gradually phased out of active service in the 1920s.

Variants

3-inch Gun, Model of 1904
New breech mechanism.

3-inch Gun, Model of 1905
Similar to the Model of 1904, except made about  lighter by reduction of the outside diameters of the gun and modification of the clip hoop that secures the barrel to the guide rails on the cradle near the muzzle. Different rifling twist.

3.8-inch Gun, Models of 1904 and 1907
Similar to the 3-inch gun, but scaled up with a significantly longer barrel -  overall gun body length instead of  - in a larger caliber, with a lengthened recoil -  instead of  - as well as with a different extractor.

Surviving examples

 
One M1904, used by Southern Utah University Army ROTC, Cedar City, Utah. It is still in working order, and fires blank rounds during football games.
Cantigny Park, in Wheaton, Illinois.
Westminster, Massachusetts
One on the courthouse grounds, New London, Missouri.
U.S. Army Ordnance Training and Heritage Center, Fort Lee, Virginia.
Fort Sam Houston, Texas
One at 45th Division Museum, Oklahoma City, Oklahoma
One at Clemson University
One at the Fort Sill museum.
One M1902, number 56, manufactured in 1905, by the Rock Island Arsenal in front of the American Legion hall, Eustis, Florida. 
Two at Texas A&M University. Operated by the Corps of Cadets, Parsons' Mounted Cavalry Half Section (the most famous is named The Spirit of '02. 
One M1905 at Tarleton State University's Corps of Cadets, operated by Rudders Riders Half Section. 
One M1902 at the Texas Military Forces Museum, Austin, Texas.
One at Minnesota State Academy for the Deaf, Faribault, Minnesota
Three at Valley Forge Military Academy and College in Wayne, Pennsylvania
One at Veterans of Foreign Wars Post no. 33, Greensburg, Pennsylvania
One M1902 in Mission County Park, San Antonio, Texas. The gun is missing its wheels.
One in Columbus, New Mexico
One in Presidio of Monterey, California
One in Annandale, Virginia
One at Liberty Park in Hudson, Massachusetts
One in New Bedford, Massachusetts
One M1905 in Cullman, Alabama on route 278 and High Way 65. It is missing the breech block and the wheels are in need of repair.
One at Camp Edwards, Massachusetts 
One at the Newport Artillery Company Armory, Newport, Rhode Island
One at High Street Cemetery, Danvers, Massachusetts
Two at Lakeview Park in the City of Lorain near Cleveland, Ohio
One M1902 on display in the city of Hopewell, Virginia
One M1904 is in the possession of 3-7 Field Artillery at Schofield Barracks, Hawaii
One M1902 is on display at the U.S. Army Museum of Hawaii at Fort DeRussy in Honolulu, Hawaii
One in Costa Mesa, California
One M1905 on the grounds of the Rush County Courthouse, Rushville, Indiana
Two at the Washington National Guard Museum, Camp Murray, Washington
One M1905 on the grounds of VFW Post 5700 in Hightstown, New Jersey
One M1902 on the parade grounds of Fort Meade, South Dakota
One M1902 at the Illinois State Military Museum in Springfield, Illinois
One M1902 at the West End World War I Memorial Park in Amsterdam, New York - serial number 155
One at the American Legion post, Patchogue, New York
Two M1902 guns sit outside Christian Brothers Academy in Albany, New York
One M1905 at the VFW Post 3911. Key West, Florida
One M1905, missing the wheels, is located in Brighton, Illinois
Two M1905 at Fort Niagara State Park, New York
One M1905 at the Nebraska National Guard Museum, Seward, Nebraska
One, model not identifiable, at the side of the American Legion post in Ottawa, Illinois
One M1905 at the Greenbrier Military School (GMS) Museum on the campus of the West Virginia School of Osteopathic Medicine in Lewisburg, West Virginia
One M1092 at the Lewis Army Museum, Joint Base Lewis-McChord Washington

See also
List of U.S. Army weapons by supply catalog designation SNL C-24
List of field guns

Weapons of comparable role, performance and era
76 mm divisional gun M1902 Russian equivalent
7.7 cm FK 96 n.A. German equivalent
Ordnance BLC 15 pounder and Ordnance QF 15 pounder British equivalent

Notes

References
"Handbook of artillery : including mobile, anti-aircraft and trench matériel (1920)"
Handbook of the 3-inch Gun Matériel, model of 1902 War Department Ordnance Form No.1659 revised June 5, 1917
"Instructions for Mounting, Using and Caring For the 3-Inch (15-pounder) Gun" revised 1913 Ordnance Form No. 1766

External links

Description of 3-inch (15 pounder) gun, model of 1903, and its breech mechanism. Ordnance Department USA 1912 revised 1917 at State Library of Victoria
Lieutenant Colonel E.L. Gruber, "Notes on the 3 inch gun materiel and field artillery equipment. Compiled for the Reserve Officers' Training Corps of Yale University". 1917.

World War I artillery of the United States
Artillery of the United States
Field guns
76 mm artillery